Christmas Jollies is the third album released by Vincent Montana Jr. and his first Christmas album. It was recorded and released on Salsoul Records in November 1976. The album includes a few new Christmas tunes, co-written by Vincent Montana Jr. himself, entitled, "There's Someone Who's Knocking" with the children's chorus singing, "Merry Christmas All" with his daughter, Denise Montana, singing the lead and "Christmas Time" with the sweet honeyed-voices of the session girl-group, The Sweethearts of Sigma, that features group members Barbara Ingram, Evette Benton and Carla Benson. This highly successful album also includes disco renditions of "The Little Drummer Boy", "Sleigh Ride" and so on, plus the orchestrated instrumental version of "Silent Night". Side two is semi-instrumental with two different medleys, such as "Christmas Medley" with the family chorus singing and "New Year's Medley" with The Salsoul Singers singing in the background. Christmas Jollies went on to become the best-selling holiday albums of 1976 and 1977.

Track listing

Side One

"The Little Drummer Boy"
"Sleigh Ride"
"Silent Night" (Instrumental)
"Merry Christmas All"
Lead Vocal - Denise Montana
"Christmas Time"
"There's Someone Who's Knocking"
Children's Chorus - Santa's Little Helpers

Side Two

Christmas Medley: "Joy to the World"/"Deck the Halls"/"O Holy Night"/"O Come, All Ye Faithful"/"Jingle Bells"/"Hark! The Herald Angels Sing"/"Santa Claus Is Comin' to Town"/"The Christmas Song"/"White Christmas"/"Rudolph the Red-Nosed Reindeer"/"I'll Be Home for Christmas"/"Winter Wonderland"/"The First Noel"/"Joy to the World (Reprise)"/"We Wish You a Merry Christmas"
Family Chorus Vocals - The Sweethearts of Sigma and Santa's Little Helpers
New Year's Medley: "Auld Lang Syne"/"I'm Looking Over a Four Leaf Clover"/"Alabama Jubilee"/"Oh, Dem Golden Slippers"/"Auld Lang Syne (Reprise)"/"God Bless America"
Chorus Vocals - The Salsoul Singers

Personnel
Keyboards - Carlton Kent
Bass - Gordon Edwards
Drums - Earl Young
Congas - Larry Washington, Osvaldo Martinez
Alto Saxophone - John Bonnie on "We Wish You a Merry Christmas" and "There's Someone Who's Knocking"
Trumpet Solos by Evan Solot on "We Wish You a Merry Christmas"
Guitars - Ronnie James, Norman Harris
Banjo - Ronnie James
Strings & Horns - Don Renaldo and His Little Helpers
Tuba - Eddie Moore
Vibes, Chimes, Marimba, Timpani, Percussion, Bells, Producer - Vincent Montana, Jr.
Vocals - The Sweethearts of Sigma: Barbara Ingram, Evette Benton, Carla Benson (tracks A1, A2 and A5)

References

External links

https://thesalsoulorchestra.bandcamp.com/album/christmas-jollies

Christmas albums by American artists
1976 Christmas albums
Salsoul Orchestra albums
Salsoul Records albums